Universal Store (also known as "Universal") is an Australian fashion retailer operating across ACT, NSW, TAS, VIC, QLD, SA, NT and WA that sells both international and national brands. The retailer specialises in streetwear, denim, skate clothing and surfwear.

Universal Store stocks brands such as Champion, Perfect Stranger, Tommy Jeans, Kiss Chacey, Thrills, and Barney Cools, as well as Denim brands such as Abrand Jeans, Nobody Denim, Wrangler and Lee.

See also

List of companies of Australia

References

External links
 

Australian companies established in 1999
Retail companies established in 1999
Clothing retailers of Australia
Companies based in Brisbane